Stilbotulasnella is a fungal genus in the Tulasnellaceae family. The genus is monotypic, containing the single species Stilbotulasnella conidiophora, found in Hawaii.

References

External links
 

Cantharellales
Monotypic Basidiomycota genera
Taxa named by Franz Oberwinkler
Taxa described in 1982